The Apollo of Veii is a life-size painted terracotta Etruscan statue of Apollo (Aplu), designed to be placed at the highest part of a temple. The statue was discovered in the Portonaccio sanctuary of ancient Veii, Latium, in what is now central Italy, and dates from c. 510 - 500 BC. It was created in the so-called "international" Ionic or late-archaic Etruscan style.

It was discovered in 1916, and is now on display in the National Etruscan Museum in Rome.

Creator
The statue was probably made by Vulca, an Etruscan artist who was also responsible for the Temple of Jupiter Optimus Maximus, according to Pliny. He is the only Etruscan artist known by name.

Mythological depiction
This terracotta statue was part of a scene of Apollo and Heracles contending over the Ceryneian Hind, placed 12 metres above the ground on beams on the acroterion of the Portonaccio Sanctuary of Minerva.

The statue is dressed in a tunic and short cloak, advancing towards the left with the right arm outstretched and bent (the statue's left arm is towards the ground and may have held a bow).

Together with other statues, it decorated the roof beams of the Portonaccio temple, a sanctuary dedicated to Minerva. Placed on high plinths, this series of statues were acroterial. They stood some twelve metres above the ground level and even though they were created separately, they narrated events from Greek mythology that were at least in part tied to the god Apollo.

This statue, together with the statue of Heracles, formed a group representing one of the labours of the hero before his apotheosis made him one of the divinities of Olympus. The myth narrates the contention between the god and the hero for the possession of the doe with the golden horns. There was probably also a statue of Mercury united to this group, of which only the head and a part of the body remain. Apollo, dressed in a tunic and short cloak, advances towards his left with his right arm outstretched and bent (his left arm is towards the ground, perhaps holding a bow); Heracles, with the doe tied around is outstretched towards the right, leaning forwards to attack with his bludgeon and with his torso in a violent curve.

Analysis 
The group was conceived for a lateral vision and the solid volume of the figures united with the dissymmetry both in Apollo (the torso and face) and in the Heracles torso suggest that the artist understood optical deformations. The style of the statues is in the ambit of the “international” Ionic style that characterizes the Etruscan artistic culture of the late 6th century BC. The sculpture reaches a very high level of expression.

See also
 Antefix
 Etruscan civilization
 Ornament (architecture)
 List of classical architecture terms

Sources

References

External links
Statue website

6th-century BC works
Collections of the Villa Giulia
Etruscan ceramics
Etruscan sculptures
Terracotta sculptures
Veii
Etruscan architecture
1916 archaeological discoveries